Titz is a German surname belonging to the group of family names derived from given names. Like the related Dittrich, Dietz, Dietze, Tietz, Tietze and the Ashkenazi Taitz it is an altered form of the frequent masculine given name Dietrich.

Notable persons with this name include:
 Anton Ferdinand Titz (1742–1811), German composer, violin and viola d'amore player
 Christian Titz (born 1971), German professional football manager and former player
 Coretti Arle-Titz (1881–1951), American jazz, spiritual, and pop music singer
 Erich Kaiser-Titz (1875–1928), German stage and film actor

Patronymic surnames
German-language surnames
Surnames from given names